Myriam Soumaré (born 29 October 1986) is a retired French track and field sprinter. She announced her retirement from athletics in February 2016.

Athletics career

2008–2009
Soumaré made her Olympic debut at the 2008 Summer Olympics in Beijing. She competed in only one event – the 4 × 100 meters relay together with Muriel Hurtis-Houairi, Lina Jacques-Sébastien and Carima Louami. In their first round heat they did not finish and were eliminated, due to a mistake with the baton exchange.

In her debut World Championships appearance at 2009, Soumaré took part in only one event – the 100 metres. She was eliminated in the quarter-finals of that event.

2010 – three medals at the European Championships 
At the 2010 European Championships – her debut appearance in the European Championships – in Barcelona, Soumaré won the gold medal in the 200 metres with a time of 22.32 seconds in lane 8, shaving her previous personal best time by 0.69 second in doing so. She also won the 4 × 100 metres relay silver medal and the 100 metres bronze medal with a personal best time of 11.18 seconds, which was an improvement of 0.16 second over her previous personal best time.

2011 
At the 2011 World Championships in Daegu, Soumaré participated in three events – the 100 metres, 200 metres and 4 × 100 metres relay. She was eliminated in the semi-finals of the 100 and 200 metres events. Her 4 × 100 metres relay team finished in fourth place in the final.

2012 – 7th in the 200m Olympic final 
Soumaré represented France in three events at the 2012 Summer Olympics in London: 100m, 200m and 4 × 100 m relay. She finished seventh in the 200m final in a time of 22.63 sec. She achieved the 11th fastest time in the 100m semi-finals and thus did not qualify for the final. In the first round heats of the 4 × 100 m relay, her team botched its last two baton exchanges and was disqualified for out-of-zone baton exchange.

Soumaré was the 200 metres runner-up of the 2012 IAAF Diamond League, behind Charonda Williams.

2013 – European Indoor Championships 60m silver medal 
Soumaré won her first European Indoor Championships
medal at the 2013 European Indoor Championships – a silver for the 60 metres. She had initially won the bronze. But the initial winner of the 60m final, Tezdzhan Naimova, was stripped of her gold medal after being found guilty of doping during the competition. Soumaré was thus elevated to receive the silver medal.

At the 2013 World Championships in Moscow, Soumaré took part in three events – the 100 metres, 200 metres and 4 × 100 metres relay. She was eliminated in the semi-finals of the 100 and 200 metres events. Her 4 × 100 metres relay team finished the third fastest among the 19 national teams taking part in the heats, and thus qualified for the final. In the final, the French team – consisting of Céline Distel-Bonnet, Ayodelé Ikuesan, Soumaré and Stella Akakpo running in the first, second, third and fourth legs respectively – finished the race in second position (42.73 seconds) behind Jamaica. The French relay team members were duly presented their silver medals during the medal ceremony. After the medal ceremony, the British team filed a protest against the French team, claiming that the latter had an out-of-zone baton handover between Ikuesan and Soumaré. More than two hours after the race, the French relay team was officially disqualified. The French delegation appealed against their disqualification, but it was in vain. Consequently, the American team was upgraded to the silver medal and the British team received the bronze medal. Bernard Amsalem, the president of the Fédération française d'athlétisme, called the French team's disqualification "an outrage". He explained that normally the decision to disqualify a team had to be made before the medal ceremony and teams had to file protests within thirty minutes from the end of the race.

2015
Soumaré took a year off from athletics in 2015.

Retirement
On 24 February 2016, Soumaré announced her retirement from athletics, while leaving open the possibility of making a comeback in the future.

Personal life
Soumaré's parents are of Mauritanian origin. She has four siblings and is a Muslim. She lives with them in the northern Paris suburb of Villiers-le-Bel.

Soumaré works as a childcare assistant in a childcare centre. She wears a headscarf in her daily life but takes it off when she is on the track.

Soumaré gave birth to her first child, a  boy, in June 2015.

Results in the finals of international competitions
Note: Only the position in the final is indicated, unless otherwise stated

†: Disqualified in the final.

Medal record
2007 European Athletics U23 Championships in Debrecen :
 bronze in the 100 m in 11 s 68
2009 Mediterranean Games in Pescara
 gold in the 4 × 100 m relay in 43 s 79
 silver in the 100 m in 11 s 46
2010 European Athletics Championships in Barcelona :
 gold in the 200 m in 22 s 32 (personal best)
 silver in the 4 × 100 m relay in 42s 45
 bronze in the 100 m in 11 s 18
2012 European Athletics Championships in Helsinki :
 bronze in the 200 m in 23 s 21
2013 European Athletics Indoor Championships in Gothenburg :
 silver in the 60 m in 7 s 11

References

External links
 
 
 
 

1986 births
Living people
Athletes from Paris
Olympic athletes of France
Athletes (track and field) at the 2008 Summer Olympics
Athletes (track and field) at the 2012 Summer Olympics
French female sprinters
French sportspeople of Mauritanian descent
French Muslims
European Athletics Championships medalists
Mediterranean Games gold medalists for France
Mediterranean Games silver medalists for France
Athletes (track and field) at the 2009 Mediterranean Games
Mediterranean Games medalists in athletics
Olympic female sprinters